A duffel bag, duffle bag, or kit bag is a large bag made of either natural or synthetic fabric (typically canvas), historically with a top closure using a drawstring. Generally a duffel bag is used by non-commissioned personnel in the military, and for travel, sports and recreation by civilians.  When used by a sailor or marines a duffel is known as a seabag.  A duffel's open structure and lack of rigidity makes it adaptable to carrying sports gear and similar bulky objects.

A duffel bag is often confused with a hoop-handled hard-bottomed zippered bag, generically also known as a gym bag.

History 

The origin of the name is disputed. Most sources maintain the name comes from Duffel, a town in Flanders, Belgium, where the thick duffel cloth used to make the bag originated in the 17th century.

According to the Oxford English Dictionary, the word dates back to 1649, used to describe ‘a coarse woollen cloth having a thick nap or frieze’. The earliest reference of the word specifically referring to a duffel bag is 1768.

In most of the 20th century, a duffel bag typically referred to a specific style of cylindrical, top-entry bag.  During the latter part, the term began to be applied to a generic hoop-handled, hard-bottomed fabric holdall more commonly known as a "gym bag".  It is to this bag that additional features such as wheels, zippers, internal structure, and small organizing pockets are often added.

See also
 Duffel Blog, a satirical military website
 Duffel coat
 Hockey bag
 Hold-all
Rucksack

References

External links

Bags
Luggage
Duffel

de:Rucksack#Seesack